Ineti Felemi (born 28 October 1999) is a Tongan judoka.

Career 

Felemi won a gold medal in the 2017 Senior Oceania Championships after defeating Fugalaau Mafi by ippon. She won a silver medal in the 2017 Junior Oceania Championships losing to Fugalaau Mafi.

References 

1999 births
Living people
Tongan judoka